The Rudaj Organization is  the Albanian mafia in the New York City metro area, named for the man accused of being its kingpin, Alex Rudaj of Yorktown, New York. The Rudaj Organization, called "The Corporation" by its members, was started in 1993 in Westchester and spread to the Bronx and Queens. Prosecutors say the Albanian gang was headed by Alex Rudaj (Rudovic) and an Italian-American man named Nardino Colotti who both had ties to the late Gambino soldier Phil "Skinny" Loscalzo.

Organization

Alex Rudaj (also known as Sandro Rudovic, Allie Boy, Uncle Rudaj, Xhaxhai,) of Yorktown, New York is the alleged boss of the Albanian mafia's Rudaj Organization, based in the New York City metro area. Rudaj is an ethnic Albanian from Ulcinj, Montenegro who immigrated to the United States in 1987. Federal prosecutors said Rudaj was the triggerman in a 1996 shooting of another organized crime figure after a high-speed chase in the Bronx. Rudaj hung out the sunroof of a car and fired at Guy Peduto as he fled in another car. They also described an incident where Rudaj showed up with 20 thugs to get late mob boss John Gotti's table at Rao's, the legendary and exclusive East Harlem Italian restaurant. On Friday, June 16, 2006, Alex Rudaj, 38, was sentenced to 27 years in federal prison for racketeering, extortion and gambling offenses.

Nardino Colotti (born 1963) of the Bronx, New York, is an Italian American protégé of the late Gambino soldier Phil (Skinny Phil) Loscalzo and co-leader of the Albanian Mafia Rudaj Organization. Loscalzo allegedly promised Colotti territory with rackets to run in the Bronx and to propose him for Gambino family membership. However, when Loscalzo died, Sicilian Gambino soldier Joe Gambino took over his operations. Rudaj and Coletti didn't receive his territory and they neither wanted to work for Gambino, nor did they respect him. Therefore, in 1993 they became independent and founded their own organization. In addition to gambling dens in Queens the Rudaj Organization ran gambling operations in Mount Vernon and Port Chester. Nardino Colotti's group had a gambling joint on Adee Street in Port Chester and forced bar owners in Mount Vernon to install their illegal gambling machines. In one instance, Colotti's group tried to force Salvatore Misale, the owner of Puerto Roja in Mount Vernon, to hand over his bar to the Corporation. Misale went to authorities in 2003 after he endured a beating at a Bronx cafe over his refusal to hand over the keys to the bar. Lamaj (who?) sliced his ear off and then beat and cursed at him.

Federal prosecution
On October 26, 2004, the FBI and Manhattan U.S. Attorney David Kelley announced the arrest of the group's alleged boss, Alex Rudaj, and 21 other reputed mob members charged in the indictment. Kelley's office said it believes the indictment is the first federal racketeering case in the United States against an alleged organized crime enterprise run by Albanians. Kelly neglected to mention a smaller Albanian-Italian drug smuggling operation indicted by federal authorities in Brooklyn since 1981, from which a known crime associate was also charged but only received 2 years at sentencing. Several of the defendants indicted in the case are not Albanian - the organization has soldiers that are Greek, Arab and Italian - but most of the defendants in the case were either native Albanians or first-generation Albanian-Americans.

During a bail hearing for one of the two dozen people arrested in the case, Assistant U.S. Attorney Timothy Treanor said that the Albanian mob had taken over the operations of the Lucchese family in Astoria, Queens. Rudaj led an attack in August 2001 on two  Greek associates of the Lucchese crime family who ran a gambling racket inside a Greek social club called Soccer Fever at 26-80 30th St. in Queens. On August 3, 2001 Rudaj and at least six other men entered the club with guns, beating one of the men in the head with a pistol and chasing others out of the neighborhood by threatening to destroy the building.

Gambino leader Arnold Squitieri had had enough and wanted a talk with these rogue mobsters. The "sit down" took place at a gas station in a rest area near the New Jersey turnpike. Twenty armed Gambino mobsters accompanied Squitieri. Alex Rudaj on the other hand had only managed to bring six members of his crew. According to undercover FBI agent Joaquin Garcia, who infiltrated the Gambino crime family during this period, Squitieri told Rudaj that the fun was over and that they should stop expanding their operations. The Albanians and Gambinos then pulled out their weapons. Knowing they were outnumbered, the Albanians threatened to blow up the gas station with all of them in it. This ended the discussion, and both groups pulled back.

By 2006 all of the main players involved in this "sit down" were in prison. Rudaj and then personal driver and bodyguard Lumaj (who?) including all members of Sixth Family had been picked off the street in October 2004 and charged with a variety of racketeering and gambling charges. After a trial Rudaj and his main lieutenants were all found guilty. In 2006 Rudaj, at that time 38 years old, was sentenced to 27 years in prison. His rival Arnold Squitieri was convicted in an unrelated racketeering case and was sent to prison for seven years.

"What we have here might be considered a sixth crime family," after the five Mafia organizations — Bonanno, Colombo, Gambino, Genovese and Lucchese — said Fred Snelling, head of the FBI's criminal division in New York.

To date, over 20 members of the Rudaj organization have been charged with various crimes. Six of its top leaders, including Alex Rudaj himself, have been convicted. Ten more have pleaded guilty.

Trouble with Velentzas family

On August 3, 2001, members of the Albanian Rudaj Organization, attacked Greek associates of the Lucchese crime family. The brief fight was over controlling gambling rackets in Astoria, Queens.

See also
Albanian Boys

Notes

Albanian-American culture in New York (state)
Albanian Mafia
Former gangs in New York City
Organized crime groups in the United States
1993 establishments in New York (state)
2004 disestablishments in New York (state)